Palaua babelthuapi is a species of very small air-breathing land snail, a terrestrial pulmonate gastropod mollusk in the family Euconulidae, the hive snails. This species is endemic to Palau.

References

B
Endemic fauna of Palau
Molluscs of Oceania
Molluscs of the Pacific Ocean
Taxonomy articles created by Polbot